The TJ Smith Stakes is an Australian Turf Club Group 1 Thoroughbred horse race at Weight for Age run over a distance of 1200 metres at Randwick Racecourse, Sydney, Australia in the autumn during the ATC Championships series.  Total prize money is A$2,500,000.

History
The inaugural race in 1997 was known as the Endeavour Stakes. 
In 1999 the race was renamed in honour of the trainer Thomas John Smith, who won 33 racing titles in Sydney.

The race has risen in prestige due to the stakes offered. In recent years it has attracted high calibre sprinters such as Black Caviar and Takeover Target who have gone on to win overseas.

Grade
1997 - Listed Race
1998–2001 - Group 3
2002–2004 - Group 2
2005 - Group 1

Winners

 2022 - Nature Strip
2021 - Nature Strip
 2020 - Nature Strip
 2019 - Santa Ana Lane
 2018 - Trapeze Artist
 2017 - Chautauqua
 2016 - Chautauqua
 2015 - Chautauqua
 2014 - Lankan Rupee
 2013 - Black Caviar
 2012 - Master Of Design
 2011 - Black Caviar
 2010 - Melito
 2009 - Takeover Target
 2008 - Apache Cat
 2007 - Bentley Biscuit
 2006 - Red Oog
 2005 - Shamekha
 2004 - Dilly Dally
 2003 - Spinning Hill
 2002 - Phoenix Park
 2001 - Century Kid
 2000 - Shy Hero
 1999 - Ab Initio
 1998 - La Baraka
 1997 - Mahogany

Notes:
  Date of race rescheduled due to postponement of the Easter Saturday meeting because of the heavy track conditions. The meeting was moved to Easter Monday, 6 April 2015.

See also
 List of Australian Group races
 Group races

References

External links
 TJ Smith Stakes (ATC)

Open sprint category horse races
Group 1 stakes races in Australia
Breeders' Cup Challenge series
Randwick Racecourse